Bozyer can refer to:

 Bozyer, Ergani
 Bozyer, Karaçoban
 Bozyer, Seben